The Leadville Railroad is a tourist railroad based in Leadville, Colorado, United States.

.The Leadville Railroad has operated as a tourist Railroad in Leadville Colorado since 1988. Their season starts on Memorial Day weekend and runs though the 1st of April.

References

External links

Colorado railroads
Lake County, Colorado